On a chest X-ray, the sail sign is a radiologic sign that suggests left lower lobe collapse. In children, however, a sail sign could be normal, reflecting the shadow of the thymus.

The thymic sail sign or spinnaker-sail sign is due to elevation of the thymic lobes in the setting of pneumomediastinum.

References

Radiologic signs
Orthopedic surgical procedures
Respiratory system imaging